The home of Woold, an English slave trader, is located in southern Togo.  The site is being considered for inclusion in the World Heritage list of sites with "outstanding universal value" to the world.

World Heritage Status 
This site was added to the UNESCO World Heritage Tentative List on January 8, 2002 in the Cultural category.

Notes

References 
Woold Homé - UNESCO World Heritage Centre Retrieved 2009-03-04.

Togolese culture
Houses in Togo
British slave trade
African slave trade